Witold Walo (born 10 December 1954) is a Polish weightlifter. He competed in the men's middle heavyweight event at the 1980 Summer Olympics.

References

1954 births
Living people
Polish male weightlifters
Olympic weightlifters of Poland
Weightlifters at the 1980 Summer Olympics
Sportspeople from Warsaw
World Weightlifting Championships medalists
21st-century Polish people
20th-century Polish people